Polykarp Leyser II (20 November 1586, Wittenberg - 15 January 1633, Leipzig) was a German Lutheran theologian and superintendent in Leipzig. He was professor of theology since 1613.

Life

Provenance
His father Polykarp Leyser the Elder, was a theologian.  His mother was Elisabeth, daughter of the painter Lucas Cranach the Younger.

Family
He was the father of nine recorded children, most of whom became theologians.   His son, was also a theologian, but found himself cut off from his family for his controversial defense of polygamy.    One of Polykarp's sons, however, Michael Leyser became a physician and anatomist, making important contributions to documenting the medical advances of the time, notably in respect of the Lymphatic system.

His grandson Polykarp Leyser III and his great-grandson Polykarp Leyser IV were all also theologians.

References

Bibliography 
 Biography in Allgemeine Deutsche Biographie
 
 Erdmann Hannibal Albrecht: Sächsische evangelisch-luther’sche Kirchen- und Predigengeschichte, von ihrem Ursprung an die bis auf gegenwärtige Zeiten. Leipzig 1799, S. 61, (GoogleBooks)

German Lutheran theologians
17th-century German Lutheran clergy
17th-century German Protestant theologians
People from Wittenberg
1586 births
1633 deaths
German male non-fiction writers
17th-century German writers
17th-century German male writers